Henry J. Hyde (February 11, 1846 – July 25, 1893) was a United States Army Sergeant during the Indian Wars who received the Medal of Honor on August 12, 1875, for service during the winter of 1872–73.

Hyde joined the army from New York City in August 1869, and was discharged in November 1884.

Medal of Honor citation
Citation:
Gallant conduct during campaigns and engagements with Apaches.

See also

List of Medal of Honor recipients

References

1846 births
1893 deaths
People from Bangor, Maine
United States Army soldiers
American military personnel of the Indian Wars
United States Army Medal of Honor recipients
American Indian Wars recipients of the Medal of Honor